Aimé Joseph Edmond Rousse (18 March 1817 – 1 August 1906) was a French lawyer, and member of the Académie française from 1880 until his death. He was born and died in Paris.

Biography
He was called to the Barreau de Paris (Paris bar association), before becoming secretary to the Conférence des avocats, then member of the conseil de l'Ordre des avocats (1862) puis and finally bâtonnier to the barreau de Paris (1870).

He was secretary of Chaix-d'Est-Ange, of which he published the pleas, president, in 1870, of the Paris bar, he published his Pleas and Speeches in two volumes.

Elected to the Academy on May 13, 1880 to replace Jules Favre, and received by the Duc d'Aumale on April 7, 1881. He received the Vicomte de Vogüé.

Works
Consultations sur les décrets du 29 mars 1880 (1880)
Avocats et Magistrats (1903)

References

Bibliography

External links 
 Académie française

1817 births
1906 deaths
Writers from Paris
19th-century French lawyers
French legal writers
Members of the Académie Française
French male non-fiction writers
Members of the Ligue de la patrie française